The Chihuahuan alligator lizard (Barisia levicollis) is a species of medium-sized lizard in the family Anguidae. The species is endemic to Mexico.

References

Barisia
Reptiles of Mexico
Reptiles described in 1890
Taxa named by Leonhard Stejneger